Rait Käbin (born 2 September 1981) is an Estonian professional basketball coach, and a former professional basketball player. He is currently the director of TalTech.

References and notes

External links
 Rait Käbin at basket.ee 

1981 births
Living people
Estonian men's basketball players
Estonian basketball coaches
Korvpalli Meistriliiga players
BC Kalev/Cramo players
KK Pärnu players
Point guards